The Jacqueline Kennedy Onassis Reservoir, also known as Central Park Reservoir, is a decommissioned reservoir in Central Park in the borough of Manhattan, New York City, stretching from 86th to 96th Streets.

Croton Aqueduct Board president Nicholas Dean proposed the construction of Central Park around its receiving reservoir (later the Great Lawn and Turtle Pond) in the 1850s. As part of this project, the Central Park Reservoir was completed in 1862. The reservoir was decommissioned in 1993, after it was deemed obsolete, and control was transferred to the Department of Parks and Recreation in 1999. The Central Park Reservoir was renamed in honor of Jacqueline Kennedy Onassis in 1994 to commemorate her contributions to the city and because she enjoyed jogging in the area.

History

Design and construction 
In the 1850s, Central Park was proposed by Croton Aqueduct Board president Nicholas Dean, who chose the site because the Croton Aqueduct's ,  receiving reservoir would be in the geographical center. This reservoir, built in 1842, was known as the Yorkville Reservoir or the Lower Reservoir and was located on what is now the site of Turtle Pond. The site to the north was marshland, drained by the Sawkill.

In 1857 a design competition was held for Central Park. Furthermore, the plans had to incorporate a larger "Upper Reservoir" for the Croton Aqueduct. The winning design was Frederick Law Olmsted and Calvert Vaux's Greensward Plan. Vaux designed its two pumphouses of Manhattan schist with granite facings. It was never a collecting reservoir, but rather, supplemented the smaller, nearby receiving reservoir.

For several months, Central Park's commissioners faced delays and resistance from the New York City common council while attempting to gain funding. A dedicated work force and funding stream was not secured until June 1858. The landscaped Upper Reservoir was the only part of the park that the commissioners were not responsible for constructing; instead, the Reservoir would be built by the Croton Aqueduct board. Work on the Reservoir started in April 1858. The southern section of Central Park below 79th Street was mostly completed by 1860, and the Croton Aqueduct board also started filling in the Reservoir around this time. The Upper Reservoir was finished by 1862. An 1875 map of Central Park clearly shows the Lower and Upper reservoirs.

Decommissioning 

The reservoir was decommissioned in 1993, after it was deemed obsolete because of a new main under 79th Street that connected with the Third Water Tunnel, and because of growing concerns that it could become contaminated. Though deemed obsolete, it remained a part of the NYC water supply and it was intended to be used to supplement the city's upstate water supply in drought emergencies. Concern about the reservoir's future grew in early 1992: many people worried that the city would put turf over it as was done in the 1920s, when the adjacent Lower Reservoir was deemed obsolete, and the Great Lawn was developed over the Lower Reservoir's former site. Despite various plans to reuse the Upper Reservoir's site for some other purpose, residents and advocates wrote letters to the Central Park Conservancy and city government to preserve the reservoir as-is.

Papers were signed to allow for the transfer of the reservoir in 1999 from the Department of Environmental Protection to the Department of Parks and Recreation. The year 1999 was chosen because it was the projected completion date for a filtration plant at Van Cortlandt Park, near the Jerome Reservoir in the Bronx, which is part of the city's Croton water-supply system. The Croton Water Filtration Plant was activated in 2015.

Renaming 

In 1994 the Reservoir was renamed in honor of Jacqueline Kennedy Onassis to commemorate her contributions to the city (which included saving Grand Central Terminal from demolition and restoring it as an architectural landmark, protesting against the building of structures that would hinder Central Park's beauty, and serving as a board member of the Municipal Art Society) and because she enjoyed jogging in the area. The windows of her 1040 Fifth Avenue apartment, located on the Upper East Side, overlooked this area.

Description

Though no longer used to distribute New York City's water supply, it provides water for the Pool and the Harlem Meer. It is a popular place of interest in Central Park. There is a  jogging track around it used by many runners, the Stephanie and Fred Shuman Running Track, and it is also encircled by the park's bridle trail. Bill Clinton, Barack Obama, Madonna, and Jacqueline Kennedy Onassis have all run the track. Separating the track from the water, the Reservoir is surrounded by a 2003 fence that re-creates the original cast iron fence, based on a section of the original 19th-century fence that was discovered by scuba divers at the bottom of the Reservoir.

A pair of gatehouses are connected by a causeway bisecting the reservoir. The visible causeway is actually the top of a wall that splits the reservoir into two chambers, allowing one to be drained for maintenance while the other half continued operation. When the reservoir was operational, the North Gatehouse pumped water into the reservoir outside Manhattan, and the South Gatehouse pumped water out to lower Manhattan. The gatehouses were decommissioned in 1993 but remain in place today.

The Reservoir is often visited by tourists, especially when its double pink "Yoshino" cherry trees (Prunus x yedoensis), followed by "Kanzan" cherry trees Prunus serrulata, are blooming.

The rhododendrons along the "Rhododendron Mile" were a gift to the city from Mrs Russell Sage in 1909. The Reservoir area is one of the main ecological sanctuaries in the park, attracting more than 20 species of waterbirds: coots, mergansers, northern shovelers, ruddy ducks, buffleheads, loons, cormorants, wood ducks, American black ducks, gadwall, grebes, herons and egrets, along with various species of gulls, may be seen in addition to the  familiar mallards and Canada geese, making it a popular venue for birdwatchers.

In popular culture 
Films showing the Onassis Reservoir include:
 Breakfast at Tiffany's (1961)
 Marathon Man (1976)
 Hannah and Her Sisters (1986) 
 Devil's Advocate (1997)
 Sex and the City (2008)

Television shows include:
 Gossip Girl (2007–2012)
 The Boys (2019)

See also
New York City water supply system
Sawkill

References

Notes

Sources

External links

 
 
 Central Park Reservoir

Central Park
Jacqueline Kennedy Onassis
Reservoirs in Manhattan
Reservoirs in New York (state)